Mura's saddleback tamarin (Leontocebus fuscicollis mura) is a subspecies of monkey that was first seen by scientists in 2007 in the Brazilian state of Amazonas.

According to the discoverers of this new subspecies, Mura's saddleback tamarin is threatened by several planned development projects in the region, including a proposed gas pipeline, two hydroelectric dams currently in the beginning stages of construction, and, most notably, a major highway cutting through the Amazon that is currently being paved. Conservationists fear the highway could fuel wider deforestation in the Amazon over the next two decades.

References

Tamarins
Leontocebus
Subspecies
Mammals of Brazil
Endemic fauna of Brazil
Mammals described in 2009